Frictionless can refer to:
 Frictionless market
 Frictionless continuant
 Frictionless sharing
 Frictionless plane
 Frictionless flow